Dayaram (1777–1853) was a Gujarati poet of medieval Gujarati literature and was the last poet of the old Gujarati school. He is known in Gujarati literature for his literary form called Garbi, a lyric song. He was a follower of Pushtimarg of Hindu Vaishnavism. Dayaram, along with Narsinh Mehta and Meera, is considered a major contributor during the Bhakti movement in Gujarati literature.

Biography
Dayaram was born on 16 August 1777 in Chanod on the bank of the Narmada river. He was the second son of Prabhuram Pandya, a Sathodara Nagar Brahmin. His siblings, elder sister Dahigauri and younger brother Manishankar, died at the age of nine and two, respectively.

His father was a clerk. He had very little education, and he was interested in devotional songs of the Vaishnava temple. He married in his childhood, but his first wife died after two years of marriage. His second marriage did not accompany him as his father died when he was twelve years old. His mother, too, died two years later. He resided with his relatives in Chanod and Dabhoi. He traveled across India on a pilgrimage of religious places associated with Vaishnavism. His contact with Ichchharam Bhatt turned him to his religious interest.

He was initiated into Pushtimarg (Brahmasambandha) in Vikram Samvat  in 1858 by Vallabhaji Maharaj and was fully initiated in Vikram Samvat in 1861.

Works
Dayaram was the last poet of the old Gujarati school. Most of his works are written in a literary form called 'Garbi', a lyric song.

Dayaram was a devotional poet and was a follower of "Nirgun bhakti sampraday" (Pushti sampraday) in Gujarat. So he gave many Garbi describing Krishna. He used many literary, poetic forms to express his devotion. He also wrote long narrative poems based on the incidents on the Mahabharata, such as Rukmani Vivah (Marriage of Rukmini), Satyabhama Vivah (Marriage of Satyabhama), Ajamilakhyana (Story of Ajamila), Okhaharan (abduction of Aniruddha by Chitralekha).

See also 

 List of Gujarati-language writers

References

Further reading
 
 The Gujarati Lyrics of Kavi Dayarambhai by Rachel Dwyer

External links
 
 Sangeet Bhuvan Trust

Gujarati-language writers
Gujarati-language poets
1853 deaths
1777 births
Cultural history of Gujarat
Bhakti movement